Montroty is a commune in the Seine-Maritime department in the Normandy region in northern France.

Geography
The commune is found at the furthest point southeast within the department, near the border with the departments of Oise and Eure.

Population

Places of interest
 The church of St. Madeleine, dating from the eighteenth century.

See also
Communes of the Seine-Maritime department

References

Communes of Seine-Maritime